Joshua Hargreaves (8 January 1870 – 1954) was an English footballer who played in the Football League for Blackburn Rovers, New Brighton Tower and Northwich Victoria.

References

1870 births
1954 deaths
English footballers
Association football forwards
English Football League players
Blackburn Rovers F.C. players
Northwich Victoria F.C. players
New Brighton Tower F.C. players
Accrington Stanley F.C. (1891) players